Dumitru Şchiopu (born September 20, 1959) is a retired male boxer from Romania, who represented his native country at the 1980 Summer Olympics in Moscow, Soviet Union. There he lost in the quarterfinals of the men's light flyweight (– 48 kg) division to North Korea's eventual bronze medalist Li Byong-Uk.

References
 sports-reference

1959 births
Living people

Flyweight boxers
Boxers at the 1980 Summer Olympics
Olympic boxers of Romania
Romanian male boxers